"Count on Me" is a 1978 song and single by Jefferson Starship written by Jesse Barish for the album Earth. The single, in lighter rock mode, gave Starship another US Top 10 hit after "Miracles". It was featured in the end credits to the movies Grown Ups and The Family Stone.

Cash Box said it has "piano licks, a moderate beat, solid acoustic guitar solo and Marty Balin’s familiar and distinctive vocals."  Record World called it "a fine pop tune with a
country flavor."

Barish released his own version, also in 1978.

Chart performance

Weekly charts

Year-end charts

Cover versions
Balin released a new version on his 1999 solo album Marty Balin Greatest Hits.

References

1978 songs
1978 singles
Songs written by Jesse Barish
Jefferson Starship songs
RCA Records singles